Birchall is a surname.

Birchall may also refer to:

 Birchall, Staffordshire, a location in England
 Birchall Peaks, group of mountain peaks in Antarctica
 Kelly & Birchall, English architectural practice
 Birchalls, Tasmanian bookstore, education supply and stationery company